"Dolls (Sweet Rock and Roll)" (sometimes referred to as "Dolls" or "Dolls (Sweet Rock n Roll)")  is a song by Scottish band Primal Scream. It was released as the second single from the band's eighth album, Riot City Blues, on 7 August 2006, and reached number forty on the UK Singles Chart. It also features the vocals of Alison Mosshart (VV) from the British/American rock band, The Kills.

Track listings

7"
 "Dolls (Sweet Rock and Roll)"
 "Suicide Sally & Johnny Guitar" (Live XFM Session)

CD1
 "Dolls (Sweet Rock and Roll)"
 "It's Not Enough" (Written by Johnny Thunders)

CD2
 "Dolls (Sweet Rock and Roll)"
 "Zeppelin Blues While Thinking of Robert Parker"
 "Bloods" (2 Lone Swordsmen Remix)
 "Dolls (Sweet Rock and Roll)" (Video)

Trivia
This single is featured on the hit PlayStation 3 video game Motorstorm and is most commonly played on the level "Raingod messa"

External links
Single info

2006 singles
Primal Scream songs
Columbia Records singles
2006 songs
Songs written by Bobby Gillespie
Songs written by Andrew Innes
Songs written by Martin Duffy (musician)
Songs written by Robert Young (musician)